Jacob Lawrence Webb (born August 15, 1993) is an American professional baseball pitcher in the Los Angeles Angels organization. He made his Major League Baseball (MLB) debut for the Braves in 2019. He played college baseball at Tabor College. He was selected by the Braves in the 18th round of the 2014 MLB draft.

Career
Webb attended Riverside Polytechnic High School in Riverside, California, and played college baseball at Tabor College in Kansas. He was selected by the Atlanta Braves in the 18th round of the 2014 MLB draft.

Atlanta Braves
Webb made his professional debut in 2014 with the Rookie-level Gulf Coast Braves, going 2–1 with a 2.14 earned run average (ERA) in  innings pitched. He missed the 2015 season after undergoing Tommy John surgery. In 2016, he played for the Rookie Advanced Danville Braves and the Class A Rome Braves, registering a 4.85 ERA in  innings with no decisions. 

Webb split the 2017 season between the Class A-Advanced Florida Fire Frogs and the Double-A Mississippi Braves, accumulating a 5–2 record with a 2.07 ERA in 65 innings. He split his 2018 season between Mississippi and the Triple-A Gwinnett Stripers, going 3–4 with a 3.15 ERA in 53 innings. The Braves added Webb to their 40-man roster after the 2018 season. During the 2018 offseason, he played for the Estrellas de Oriente of the Dominican Winter League. 

Webb opened the 2019 season with the Gwinnett Stripers. On April 14, he was added to the major-league roster for the first time. He made his major league debut on April 16, recording one-third of an inning pitched via a strikeout of Ketel Marte. Webb earned his first win and save in a series against the Colorado Rockies. Webb's season ended in August after suffering an elbow impingement. He posted a 4–0 record with a 1.39 ERA over  innings in 2019 for the Braves.

In 2020 he had a 0.00 ERA with no decisions in eight relief appearances over 10 innings. On May 17, 2021, Webb accidentally struck New York Mets outfielder Kevin Pillar in the face with a  fastball during the seventh inning, which resulted in Pillar suffering several nasal fractures. For 2021, Webb was 5–4 with a 4.19 ERA in 34 relief appearances over  innings. The Braves finished with an 88–73 record, clinching the National League East division, and went on to win the 2021 World Series, giving the Braves their first title since 1995.

Webb began the 2022 season in spring training, and was sent to Triple A Gwinnett in March. On April 12, 2022, he was designated for assignment by the Braves. Seven days later, he was claimed by the Arizona Diamondbacks.

Arizona Diamondbacks
On April 19, 2022, Webb was claimed off waivers by the Arizona Diamondbacks. Webb did not make an appearance with the Diamondbacks, spending his entire tenure with Arizona's Triple-A affiliate, the Reno Aces. With Reno, Webb made six relief appearances posting a 10.13 ERA. On June 5, he was designated for assignment by the Diamondbacks.

Atlanta Braves (second stint) 
On June 7, 2022, Webb was traded to the Atlanta Braves for cash considerations. The Braves designated Webb for assignment on June 16, and sent him to the Gwinnett Stripers on June 19. He elected free agency on November 10, 2022.

Los Angeles Angels
On November 24, 2022, Webb signed a minor league contract with the Los Angeles Angels.

Notes

References

External links

1993 births
Living people
Baseball players from Riverside, California
Riverside Polytechnic High School alumni
Tabor College (Kansas) alumni
Major League Baseball pitchers
Atlanta Braves players
Gulf Coast Braves players
Danville Braves players
Rome Braves players
Florida Fire Frogs players
Mississippi Braves players
Gwinnett Stripers players
Reno Aces players
Estrellas Orientales players
American expatriate baseball players in the Dominican Republic